Diglossopis was a genus of blue flowerpiercers in the family Thraupidae. They are now usually placed in the genus Diglossa. They were formerly classified in the bunting and American sparrow family Emberizidae, more recent studies have shown it to belong in the Thraupidae. They are restricted to highland forest and woodland from Venezuela and Colombia, through Ecuador and Peru, to Bolivia.

Species list
 Indigo flowerpiercer, Diglossopis indigotica – based on mtDNA, belongs in the genus Diglossa.
 Golden-eyed flowerpiercer, Diglossopis glauca.
 Bluish flowerpiercer, Diglossopis caerulescens.
 Masked flowerpiercer, Diglossopis cyanea.

References 
 Mauck, & Burns (2009). Phylogeny, biogeography, and recurrent evolution of divergent bill types in the nectar-stealing flowerpiercers (Thraupini: Diglossa and Diglossopis). Biological Journal of the Linnean Society 98 (1): 14–28.
 Ridgely, R. S., & Tudor, G. (1989). Birds of South America. Vol. 1. Oxford University Press, Oxford. 

Bird genera
Taxa named by Philip Sclater
Obsolete bird taxa